The Church of St John the Evangelist is a Scottish Episcopal church in the centre of Edinburgh, Scotland. It is sited at the west end of Princes Street at its junction with Lothian Road, and is protected as a category A listed building.

Background
The church was dedicated as St John's Chapel on Maundy Thursday 1818 with construction having begun in 1816. It was designed by the architect William Burn the previous year, at the age of only 25.

The congregation had begun in 1792 when Daniel Sandford came to Edinburgh to minister on Church of England lines. In 1797 the Qualified congregation  moved to Charlotte Chapel which was re-built on larger lines in 1811. They sold shares to fund a new church, the banker Sir William Forbes being the main figure, and Charlotte Chapel was then sold to the Baptists.

Edward Bannerman Ramsay joined St John's as curate in 1827. He succeeded Bishop Sandford as minister in 1830, and stayed until his own death in 1872, having been Dean from 1846.

The sanctuary and chancel were built in 1879–82 by Peddie & Kinnear (John Dick Peddie and Charles Kinnear). The vestry and Hall were added in 1915–16 by John More Dick Peddie and Forbes Smith.

The war memorial was added in 1919 to a design by Sir Robert Lorimer. Lorimer also designed and oversaw the addition of faux-vaults when Lothian Road was widened in 1926.

St John's holds daily services and is one of the few remaining Episcopal churches in Scotland to hold the weekly service of Matins.

Description

The plaster ceiling vault is derived from that found in the Henry VII Chapel in Westminster Abbey.

Stained glass is largely by Ballantine, but the east window is by William Raphael Eginton.

The morning chapel was furnished by Walker Todd in 1935.

An extension was added to the south-east corner in 2018.

List of rectors
 1804–1830: Daniel Sandford
 1830–1872: Edward Bannerman Ramsay
 1873–1883: Daniel Fox Sandford
 1883–1909: George James Cowley-Brown
 1909–1919: George Frederick Terry 
 1919–1926: James Geoffrey Gordon 
 1927–1939: Charles Henry Ritchie
 1940–1947: Sidney Harvie-Clark
 1947–1961: David Brownfield Porter 
 1962–1969: Keith Appleby Arnold
 1969–1981: Aeneas Mackintosh
 1982–1997: Neville Chamberlain 
 1998–2012: John Andrew Armes 
 2013–date: Markus Dünzkofer (instituted 11/02/2013)

Memorials

 General Sir John Campbell, 2nd Baronet of New Brunswick, Canada 
 Sir Henry Raeburn 
 Dean Edward Bannerman Ramsay (a tall granite Celtic cross by Robert Rowand Anderson of 1878 with Celtic bronze reliefs by Skidmore, facing Princes Street just east of the church)
 John Stuart Stuart-Forbes (1849–1876) (also known as J. S. Hiley; died at the Battle of the Little Bighorn in North America. His plaque can be found on the left hand side of the church as you enter) The plaque reads "In Memory of John Stuart Stuart Forbes 7th Regt. United States Cavalry. Born at Rugby 28th May 1849. Killed in Action 25th June 1876."

Graveyard
 The Rev Archibald Alison (1757-1839) and his son William Pulteney Alison (1790-1859)
 Sir William Arbuthnot, 1st Baronet (1766-1829)
 Lesley Baillie (1768–1843) subject of Robert Burns' poem "Bonnie Lesley"
 Thomas Balfour (1810–1838), MP for Orkney and Shetland
 George Joseph Bell (1770–1843), legal author
 George Burnett, Lord Lyon (1822-1890)
 General Sir Archibald Campbell, 1st Baronet (1769–1843)
 William Campbell, Lord Skerrington (1855–1927), Senator of the College of Justice 1908-9
 Major General Nicholas Carnegie of Coates (d.1824)
 Sir James Clerk of Penicuik (1812–1870)
 James Donaldson (1751–1830), founder of Donaldson's School for the Deaf
 Andrew Duncan (1773–1832)
 Daniel Ellis (botanist) (1772–1841)
 William Erskine (1773-1852) historian
 Sir Hugh Bates Maxwell and Sir William Maxwell, 9th and 10th Baronets of Calderwood (within the eastern enclosure)
 Sir William Forbes's son George Forbes (died 1857)
 Sir William Hamilton, 9th Baronet (1788–1856), metaphysician (stone moved and used as edge paving in the eastern enclosure)
 Thomas Kinnear (1796-1830) banker
 Thomas Laycock (physiologist) (1812–1874)
 James Skene (d.1864) and his son William Forbes Skene (1805-1892) buried under the chapel
 Aeneas MacBean (1778-1857) prominent lawyer
 Aeneas James George Mackay (1839-1911) 
 Charles Kincaid Mackenzie, Lord Mackenzie (d.1938)
 General Anthony MacRae (1812–1868), with bronze by Sir John Steell
 George Moir (1800–1870), lawyer and essayist
 John Shank More (1784–1861)
 Macvey Napier (1776–1847)
 Margaret Outram (1778–1863), widow of Benjamin Outram
 Bouverie Francis Primrose (1813-1898)
 Anne (1793-1825), sister of Stamford Raffles
 Dean Edward Bannerman Ramsay (buried distant from the memorial on Princes Street (see above) with a separate monument) and his brother Admiral Sir William Ramsay (1796-1871)
 Bishop Harry Reid (died 1943)
 Sir James Milles Riddell, 2nd Baronet (1787-1861)
 Anne Rutherford (mother of Sir Walter Scott)
 Daniel Rutherford (1749-1819) discoverer of nitrogen (uncle of Sir Walter Scott)
 Daniel Fox Sandford (1831–1906), Bishop of Tasmania, son of Daniel Sandford (bishop of Edinburgh), founder of the church.
 Catherine Sinclair (1800–1864), author
 Sir John James Stuart of Allanbank (1779-1849)
 James Syme (1799–1870), surgeon
 Peter Guthrie Tait (1831-1901) and his sons John Guthrie Tait (1861-1945) and William Archer Porter Tait (1866-1929) plus a memorial to Frederick Guthrie Tait (buried in South Africa)
 William John Thomson RSA (1771–1845), American-born artist, member of the Royal Scottish Academy
 James Walker (1781–1862), civil engineer
 Bishop James Walker (1770–1841)
 Sir William Stuart Walker (1813-1896)
 George Young, Lord Young (1819–1907)
Malvina Wells (1804-1887) only known person buried in Edinburgh who was born enslaved.

Edinburgh City Centre Churches Together

St John's is one of three churches which form Together, an ecumenical grouping in the New Town of Edinburgh. The others are St Andrew's & St George's West and St Cuthbert's.

Just Festival

The church is also home to the Just Festival (formerly known as the Festival of Spirituality and Peace), which takes place each August alongside the Edinburgh Festival Fringe.

Tabot
An Ethiopian tabot, a replica of Moses' Tablets of Law, was discovered in storage at St John's Church, and was returned in February 2002 to Addis Ababa.

Same-sex marriage
in 2017, the Scottish Episcopal Church changed its marriage canon to allow for clergy with the consent of their congregations to opt into the Scottish same-sex marriage legislation. The first marriage of a couple of the same gender inside an Anglican church in the British Isles was solemnised at St John's in September that year with the rector presiding.

See also
St Kentigern's Church, Edinburgh (Union Canal), began as a mission from St John's

References

External links
 Official website
 Choir website
 St John's on ScotlandPlaces
 "The Episcopal Congregation of Charlotte Chapel, Edinburgh, 1794–1818",  University of Stirling PhD thesis by Eleanor M. Harris

Episcopal church buildings in Edinburgh
Churches completed in 1818
19th-century Episcopal church buildings
Category A listed buildings in Edinburgh
Listed churches in Edinburgh
19th century in Scotland
1818 establishments in Scotland
19th-century churches in the United Kingdom